Jean Callandar Milligan (1886–1978) was a physical education teacher at Jordanhill College who founded the Scottish Country Dance Society. She is credited with creating the modern incarnation of Scottish country dance.

References

Physical education in the United Kingdom
Scottish country dance